Howard George "Rope" Engleman (November 20, 1919 – January 12, 2011) was an American college basketball standout at the University of Kansas from 1939 to 1941. He was  tall, weighed 170 pounds (82 kg). and played the forward position. As a senior in 1940–41, Engleman averaged 16.5 points per game and became just the second Jayhawk to be named a Consensus First Team All-American. Engleman led Kansas to two Big Six Conference regular season championships and as runners-up in the 1940 National Championship. The Jayhawks lost to Indiana, 60–42, but Engleman was the tournament's top scorer after scoring 39 points in three games. When asked about the preparations to play against the Hoosiers, Engleman responded:

We didn't know what to expect because we had never seen Indiana. The only scouting report we had was a letter from a KU alumnus back there [in Indiana].

After graduating, Engleman joined the Navy and fought in World War II. After the war ended, he would become an assistant coach under Phog Allen after he graduated in 1941. In the middle of the 1946–47 season, Allen became sick and was ordered by doctors to rest, and Engleman resumed the remainder of the season as the interim head coach. In the final 14 games of the season, Engleman compiled an 8–6 record.

He had his jersey retired on March 1, 2003.

Personal
Engleman was a native of Arkansas City, Kansas and graduated from Arkansas City High School in 1937 after leading the Bulldogs to second- and third-place finishes in the state basketball tournament. He got his nickname "Rope" from his blond, curly locks of hair. He worked as a lawyer in Salina, Kansas, after earning his law degree from the University of Kansas School of Law.

References

1919 births
2011 deaths
20th-century American lawyers
All-American college men's basketball players
American men's basketball coaches
American men's basketball players
Basketball coaches from Kansas
Basketball players from Kansas
College men's basketball head coaches in the United States
Forwards (basketball)
Kansas Jayhawks men's basketball coaches
Kansas Jayhawks men's basketball players
Kansas lawyers
Phillips 66ers players
Sportspeople from Salina, Kansas
United States Navy personnel of World War II
United States Navy sailors